7870 may refer to:
Exynos 7 Octa 7870, a system on chip released in 2016
Radeon HD 7870, graphics chipset released in 2012